Donald Ray Brown (born March 28, 1954) is an American jazz pianist and producer.

Brown was born in Hernando, Mississippi and raised in Memphis, Tennessee, where he learned to play trumpet and drums in his youth. From 1972 to 1975, he was a student at Memphis State University, by which time he had made piano his primary instrument. He was with Art Blakey's Jazz Messengers from 1981 to 1982, then took teaching positions at Berklee College of Music from 1983 to 1985 and the University of Tennessee from 1988. Brown has recorded for Evidence, Muse, and Sunnyside.

Discography

As leader/co-leader

As sideman
With Art Blakey
 Killer Joe with George Kawaguchi (Union Jazz, 1981)
 Keystone 3 (Concord Jazz, 1982)
 Feeling Good (Delos, 1986)
With Donald Byrd
Getting Down to Business (Landmark, 1989)
A City Called Heaven (Landmark, 1991)
With Ricky Ford
Tenor Madness Too! (Muse, 1992)
With Wallace Roney
Obsession (Muse, 1990)

As producer
With Kenny Garrett
 African Exchange Student (Atlantic, 1990)
 Black Hope (Warner Bros., 1992)
 Triology (Warner Bros. 1995)
 Songbook (Warner Bros., 1997)
 Seeds from the Underground (Mack Avenue, 2012)
 Pushing the World Away (Mack Avenue, 2013)
 Do Your Dance! (Mack Avenue, 2016)

With Scott Tixier
 Cosmic Adventure (Sunnyside, 2016)

References 

American jazz pianists
American male pianists
1954 births
The Jazz Messengers members
Living people
Muse Records artists
People from Hernando, Mississippi
Musicians from Memphis, Tennessee
20th-century American pianists
Jazz musicians from Mississippi
American male jazz musicians
Sunnyside Records artists